Bob Brechtel (born 1949) is a member of the Wyoming State House of Representatives.  He has been in the State House since 2002.  He is currently the sponsor of bills to regulate abortion in the state including one requiring that ultrasounds be performed before an abortion.

Bechtel is a Roman Catholic.  He and his wife Leann are the parents of four children.

References

Sources 
 Casper Star-Tribune. 31 January, 2009
 Vote Smart entry on Brechtel

1949 births
Members of the Wyoming House of Representatives
Living people